Edem Atovor (born 10 April 1994) is a Ghanaian footballer. She played for Lady Strikers, Maccabi Kishronot Hadera FC and the Ghana women's national team,  and now plays for Israeli Club Hapoel Petah Tikva.

Career

Club 
Atovor started her career in 2005 with the Ghatel Ladies in Cape Coast. In 2007, she moved to the senior team. After three years for the Ghatel Ladies in Ghana's highest league, she switched to the Cape Coast Vodafone Ladies. After a season in the zone Three Women's League for the Vodafone Ladies, she changed 2011 to the city rivals Lady Strikers. There she could not cope and therefore changed with the start of the 2012 season on loan from the Lady Strikers, to her former youth club Cape Coast Ghatel Ladies. This season, she celebrated her most successful season and was nominated for the Shield National Player Award as one of the 3 best Most Valuable Players of the season. Nominated for the Shield National Player Award. At the following awards at the State Banquet Hall in Accra, she was awarded a Shield NP Award as Most Dedicated Female Player. Then she returned to the Lady Strikers.

International 
Atovor took part in the Women's 2008 U-17 World Cup and the Black Princess in the 2010 U-20 World Cup. Since 2011 has been a member of the Ghanaian women's national team.

Achievements 
Individual Awards:
 Shield National Player Award (1) 2012
 Club Awards
 Zone 3' Women's League (1)

References

External links

1994 births
Living people
Ghanaian women's footballers
Women's association footballers not categorized by position
Lady Strikers F.C. players
Ligat Nashim players
Ghana women's international footballers
Ghanaian expatriate women's footballers
Ghanaian expatriate sportspeople in Israel
Expatriate women's footballers in Israel